Boyd Muir is a music industry executive and the chief financial officer and executive vice president of Universal Music Group.

Career
Muir's music industry career began in the entertainment media division of Ernst & Young in London from 1984 until 1991. He then served as the head of internal audit at EMI from 1991 to 1994, and was closely involved with the company's acquisition of Virgin Music and Chrysalis Records.

In 2010, Lucian Grainge named Muir the CFO of Universal Music Group. As CFO, Muir oversees global finance operations as well as UMG's global merchandising company, Bravado, and producer and distributor of music video programming, Eagle Rock Entertainment. Muir was also involved with a number of acquisitions for the company, including Sanctuary Group and V2 Music Group, as well as Universal Music Group's 2013 acquisition of EMI.

Other UMG ventures
In addition to his roles as CFO and executive vice president, Muir is also the chair of the Universal Music's compliance committee, which oversees the head of global compliance. He is also the Member of Executive Management Board at UMG.

Industry honors and achievements
In 2015 and 2016, Muir made the 12th spot on the Billboard Power 100. He is credited with revising UMG's digital structure, developing a playlist strategy, and bringing in new talent to head the company's film, television, and theater department. Muir also made the list in 2014 at #37.

References

External links
Boyd Muir at Universal Music Group

Universal Music Group
Living people
American music industry executives
Year of birth missing (living people)